Millburn Magic is an American women’s soccer team founded in 2007. The team is a member of the Women's Premier Soccer League, the third tier of women’s soccer in the United States and Canada. The team plays in the Northeast Atlantic (Mid) Division of the East Conference.

The team plays its home games at Robert T. Shields Field on the campus of Farleigh Dickinson University's College at Florham in Madison, New Jersey, four miles south-east of downtown Morristown. The club's colors are white and royal blue.

The Magic organization is owned and operated by the New Jersey Soccer Group, a management company for a family of soccer-based companies offering soccer services in New Jersey.

History

Players

Current roster
as at May 6, 2015

Notable former players

Year-by-year

Coaches
  Andy Sones (2008–2010)
  Sean Kiernan (2011–2012)
  Tom Worthington (2012–Present)

Stadia
 Dr. Keith A. Neigel Stadium, Millburn, New Jersey (2008–2009)
 Robert T. Shields Field, Fairleigh Dickinson University (College at Florham), Madison, New Jersey (2010–present)

External links
 Official Site
 WPSL Millburn Magic page

   

Madison, New Jersey
Women's Premier Soccer League teams
Association football clubs established in 2007
Women's soccer clubs in the United States
Soccer clubs in New Jersey
2007 establishments in New Jersey
Women's sports in New Jersey